was a Japanese Nippon Professional Baseball player. He played for the Nishitetsu Lions, and continued his entire career with them.

From 2002 to 2003, he was the manager of the Seibu Lions, as well as the Orix BlueWave in 2004.

External links
 

1949 births
Crown Lighter Lions players
Japanese expatriate baseball players in the United States
Living people
Managers of baseball teams in Japan
Nippon Professional Baseball infielders
Nishitetsu Lions players
Orix BlueWave managers
Seibu Lions managers
Seibu Lions players
Baseball people from Hiroshima Prefecture
Taiheiyo Club Lions players
Yomiuri Giants players